Bewafa Sanam is a 1995 Hindi-language musical thriller film directed and produced by Gulshan Kumar. It stars his younger brother Krishan Kumar, Shilpa Shirodkar, Aruna Irani, Beena Banerjee, Shakti Kapoor and Kiran Kumar. The screenplay was written by Sachin Bhowmick, dialogues by Madan Joshi, and story by Gulshan Kumar.

Plot 
Sundar and Sheetal love each other and hope to get married soon. His mother approves of this alliance. Sundar makes his living by playing cricket and has become a very popular cricketer which has brought about many enemies in his life. Among them are Gautam, who conspires with Sheetal to bring about the downfall of Sundar, to which Sheetal agrees because Gautam has Sheetal's mother captive and threatens to kill her if Sheetal does not agree to all his schemes. Gautam sends goons after Sundar who thrashes them and is arrested.

In prison, Sundar finds out about Sheetal and Gautam's wedding. He manages to escape and gatecrashes the wedding and shoots Sheetal. He is charged for this crime and is given the death sentence. Later on, a journalist tries to help him and finds out everything that happened. It is revealed that the actual murderer was Gautam. Once Sundar realises that Sheetal was forced to do everything and she actually loved him, he requests the authorities to let him visit her grave one last time before he is hanged for his crime and they fulfill his request. Sundar kisses the grave and the police come with a letter saying that Sundar is free. Everyone is happy and rushes to tell Sundar, but he had died by the grave of his lover.

Cast
Krishan Kumar as Sundar
Shilpa Shirodkar as Sheetal/Mamta (dual roles)
Shakti Kapoor as Jailor Zalim Singh 
Kiran Kumar as Jailor Ramprasad Shukla, Mamta's father
Asrani as Omkar, college canteen owner
Paintal as Ramu Kaka
Aruna Irani as Sheetal's mother
Beena Banerjee as Shilpa Shirodkar Mamta's mother
Reema Lagoo as Sunder's mother
Rakesh Bedi as inmate No. 204
 Master Sagar as Gautam
Sadashiv Amrapurkar as John

Soundtrack
The music was composed by Nikhil-Vinay
Amar Utpal, Milind Sagar and Raju Singh.
Sonu Nigam was main male voice while Anuradha Paudwal and Poornima were female voices.
Udit Narayan, Nitin Mukesh and Kumar Sanu also rendered their voice for 1-1 song of the album. 
The album became very popular. 
"Achha Sila Diya", by Sonu Nigam is still popular & Udit Narayan and Kumar Sanu sang a rare song for this film, "O Dil Tod Ke Hasti Ho Mera".

Track listing

References

External links
 

1995 films
1990s Hindi-language films
T-Series (company) films
Films scored by Nikhil-Vinay